The Women's 400 metres event  at the 2004 IAAF World Indoor Championships was held on March 5–6.

Medalists

Results

Heat
First 2 of each heat (Q) and next 4 fastest (q) qualified for the semifinals.

Semifinals
First 3 of each semifinal (Q) qualified for the final.

Final

References
Results

400
400 metres at the World Athletics Indoor Championships
2004 in women's athletics